Haidomyrmecinae, occasionally called Hell ants, are an extinct subfamily of ants (Formicidae) known from Cretaceous fossils found in ambers of North America, Europe, and Asia, spanning the late Albian to Campanian, around 100 to 79 million years ago. The subfamily was first proposed in 2003, but had been subsequently treated as the tribe Haidomyrmecini and placed in the extinct ant subfamily Sphecomyrminae.  Reevaluation of Haidomyrmecini in 2020 lead to the elevation of the group back to subfamily. The family contains the nine genera and thirteen species.

Members of this family are highly distinct from all other ants, having diverse head ornamentation, and unusually shaped, extended mandibles that articulated vertically rather than horizontally as in modern ants. The jaws in combination with the head ornamentation served to restrain prey, with most species having setae (hair-like structures) covering parts of the head which likely functioned as triggers to rapidly close the jaw when disturbed similar to those of modern trap-jaw ants. Fossils indicate that haidomyrmecines were able to take prey solitarily. Like modern ants, they were eusocial, with distinct worker and queen castes, likely with relatively small colony sizes. Due to their lack of metabolic stores, it is likely that the queens engaged in hunting during the initial foundation of the nest. Haidomymecines are thought to be amongst the most basal and earliest diverging group of ants known.

Genera 

Including the type genus Haidomyrmex, the subfamily contains ten genera and fourteen species.

The vast majority of species are known from Burmese amber, which dates to the mid-Cretaceous, around 100 million years ago. Other species are known from French amber of equivalent age, as well as the Canadian amber of Alberta, Canada, which dates to around 80 million years ago.

Aquilomyrmex 
A. huangi  
Ceratomyrmex 
Ce. ellenbergeri 
Chonidris 
Ch. insolita 
Dhagnathos 
Dh. autokrator 
Dilobops 
Di. bidentata 
Haidomyrmex 
Hx. cerberus 
Hx. scimitarus 
Hx. zigrasi 
Haidomyrmodes 
Hs. mammuthus  
Haidoterminus 
Ht. cippus 
Linguamyrmex 
L. brevicornis 
L. rhinocerus 
L. vladi 
Protoceratomyrmex 
 P. revelatus

References

External links
 The Reign of the Hell Ants PBS Eons, Jan 21, 2021

 
†Haidomyrmecinae
Cretaceous insects
Fossil ant taxa